The  ("Overhuman") is a concept in the philosophy of Friedrich Nietzsche. The  represents a shift from otherworldly Christian values and manifests the grounded human ideal.

In English 

In 1896, Alexander Tille made the first English translation of Thus Spoke Zarathustra, rendering  as "Beyond-Man". In 1909, Thomas Common translated it as "Superman", following the terminology of George Bernard Shaw's 1903 stage play Man and Superman. Walter Kaufmann lambasted this translation in the 1950s for two reasons: first, the failure of the English prefix "super" to capture the nuance of the German  (though in Latin, its meaning of "above" or "beyond" is closer to the German); and second, for promoting misidentification of Nietzsche's concept with the comic-book character Superman. Kaufmann and others preferred to translate  as "overman". A translation like "superior humans" might better fit the concept of Nietzsche as he unfolds his narrative. Scholars continue to employ both terms, some simply opting to reproduce the German word.

The German prefix  can have connotations of superiority, transcendence, excessiveness, or intensity, depending on the words to which it is attached. Mensch refers to a human being, not a male specifically as it is still sometimes erroneously believed. The adjective  means super-human: beyond human strength or out of proportion to humanity.

This-worldliness

The turn away from the earth is prompted, he says, by a dissatisfaction with life that causes the sufferer to imagine another world which will fulfill his revenge. The  grasps the earthly world with relish and gratitude.

Zarathustra declares that the Christian escape from this world also required the invention of an immortal soul separate from the earthly body. This led to the abnegation and mortification of the body, or asceticism.

Death of God and the creation of new values

While the concept of God was the ultimate expression of other-worldly values and their underlying instincts, belief in God nevertheless did give meaning to life for a time. "God is dead" means that the idea of God can no longer provide values. Nietzsche refers to this crucial paradigm shift as a reevaluation of values. According to Nietzsche, the moral doctrine of Catholicism had become outdated. With the sole source of values exhausted, the danger of nihilism looms.

If the  acts to create new values within the moral vacuum of nihilism, there is nothing that this creative act would not justify. Alternatively, in the absence of this creation, there are no grounds upon which to criticize nor justify any action, including the particular values created and the means by which they are promulgated.

In order to avoid a relapse into Platonic idealism or asceticism, the creation of these new values cannot be motivated by the same instincts that gave birth to those tables of values. Instead, they must be motivated by a love of this world and of life. Whereas Nietzsche diagnosed the Christian value system as a reaction against life and hence destructive in a sense, the new values which the  will be responsible for will be life-affirming and creative (see Nietzschean affirmation).

As a goal 
All human life would be given meaning by how it advanced a new generation of human beings.

This is most pronounced when considered in the aspect of a goal that humanity sets for itself. The reduction of all psychology to physiology implies, to some, that human beings can be bred for cultural traits. This interpretation of Nietzsche's doctrine focuses more on the future of humanity than on a single cataclysmic individual. There is no consensus regarding how this aspect of the  relates to the creation of new values.

Re-embodiment of amoral aristocratic values

For Rüdiger Safranski, the  represents a higher biological type reached through artificial selection and at the same time is also an ideal for anyone who is creative and strong enough to master the whole spectrum of human potential, good and "evil", to become an "artist-tyrant". In Ecce Homo, Nietzsche vehemently denied any idealistic, democratic or humanitarian interpretation of the : "The word  [designates] a type of supreme achievement, as opposed to 'modern' men, 'good' men, Christians, and other nihilists ... When I whispered into the ears of some people that they were better off looking for a Cesare Borgia than a Parsifal, they did not believe their ears."

Relation to the eternal recurrence
The  shares a place of prominence in Thus Spoke Zarathustra with another of Nietzsche's key concepts:  the eternal recurrence of the same. Several interpretations for this fact have been offered.

This is in part due to the fact that even the  can appear like an other-worldly hope. The  lies in the future – no historical figures have ever been  – and so still represents a sort of eschatological redemption in some future time.

Rather than positing an as-yet unexperienced perfection, Nietzsche would be the prophet of something that has occurred a countless number of times in the past.

Values involve a rank-ordering of things, and so are inseparable from approval and disapproval; yet it was dissatisfaction that prompted men to seek refuge in other-worldliness and embrace other-worldly values. Willing the eternal recurrence is presented as accepting the existence of the low while still recognizing it as the low, and thus as overcoming the spirit of gravity or asceticism.

This action nearly kills Zarathustra, for example, and most human beings cannot avoid other-worldliness because they really are sick, not because of any choice they made.

Use by the Nazis

The term  was used frequently by Hitler and the Nazi regime to describe their idea of a biologically superior Aryan or Germanic master race; a racial version of Nietzsche's  became a philosophical foundation for Nazi ideas. The Nazi notion of the master race also spawned the idea of "inferior humans" (Untermenschen) who should be dominated and enslaved; this term does not originate with Nietzsche, who was critical of both antisemitism and German nationalism. In his final years, Nietzsche began to believe that he was in fact Polish, not German, and was quoted as saying, "I am a pure-blooded Polish nobleman, without a single drop of bad blood, certainly not German blood". In defiance of nationalist doctrines, he claimed that he and Germany were great only because of "Polish blood in their veins", and that he would "[have] all anti-semites shot." Nietzsche died long before Hitler's reign, and it was partly Nietzsche's sister Elisabeth Förster-Nietzsche who manipulated her brother's words to accommodate the worldview of herself and her husband, Bernhard Förster, a prominent German nationalist and antisemite. Förster founded the Deutscher Volksverein (German People's League) in 1881 with Max Liebermann von Sonnenberg.

 Anarchism 
The thought of Nietzsche had an important influence on anarchist authors. Spencer Sunshine writes:

The influential American anarchist Emma Goldman, in the preface of her famous collection Anarchism and Other Essays, defends both Nietzsche and Max Stirner from attacks within anarchism when she says

Sunshine says that the "Spanish anarchists also mixed their class politics with Nietzschean inspiration." Bookchin, in his 1973 introduction to Sam Dolgoff's The Anarchist Collectives, even describes the reconstruction of society by the workers as a Nietzschean project. Bookchin says that

See also

 References 
Notes

Bibliography
 
 Knoll, Manuel (2014) "The Übermensch as Social and Political Task: A Study in the Continuity of Nietzsche’s Political Thought", in: Knoll, Manual and Stocker, Barry (eds.) (2014) Nietzsche as Political Philosopher, Berlin/Boston, pp. 239–266.
 Lampert, Laurence (1986) Nietzsche's Teaching:  An Interpretation of Thus Spoke Zarathustra.  New Haven:  Yale University Press.
 Nietzsche, Friedrich (1885) Thus Spoke Zarathustra Nietzsche, Friedrich; Hollingdale, R. J. and Rieu, E.V. (eds.) (1961_ Thus Spoke Zarathustra  Penguin Classics: Penguin Publishing (Originally published 1885)
 Rosen, Stanley (1995) The Mask of Enlightenment: Nietzsche's Zarathustra.  New York:  Cambridge University Press.
 Safranski, Rudiger (2002 Nietzsche: A Philosophical Biography.  Translated by Shelley Frisch.  New York:  W.W. Norton & Co.
 Wilson, Colin (1981) The Outsider''. Los Angeles:  J.P. Tarcher.

External links
 

 Martin Heidegger and Nietzsche’s Overman: Aphorisms on the Attack
 Human Superhuman Yahoo! Group dedicated to Nietzsche's Overman.
 Searchable database of Nietzsche Quotes
 An academic exchange concerning the relationship between Nietzsche and transhumanism 

Conceptions of self
Concepts in aesthetics
Concepts in epistemology
Concepts in ethics
Concepts in metaphilosophy
Concepts in metaphysics
Concepts in political philosophy
Concepts in social philosophy
Existentialism
German words and phrases
Nordicism
Philosophy of Friedrich Nietzsche
Prediction